Farewell Performance is a 1963 British crime film directed by Robert Tronson and starring David Kernan, Frederick Jaeger and Delphi Lawrence. It is considered a lost film and is on the BFI National Archive's 75 Most Wanted List of missing films. It features musical interludes from Joe Meek acts like The Tornados and Heinz.

Plot
After a pop singer is murdered, the police have to figure out which of his many enemies is responsible.

Cast
 David Kernan – Ray Baron
 Delphi Lawrence – Janice Marlon
 Frederick Jaeger – Paul Warner
 Derek Francis – Superintendent Raven
 Alfred Burke – Marlon
 John Kelland – Mitch
 Toni Gilpin – Carol
 James Copeland – Andrews
 Ron Perry – Dennis
 Denise Coffey – Dickie
 Artro Morris – George
 Sean Lynch – Harry
 Hugh Futcher – Max
 Donald Tandy – Woods
 Middleton Woods – Pop
 Fred Hugh – Manager

See also
List of lost films

References

External links
BFI 75 Most Wanted entry, with extensive notes

1963 films
1963 crime films
British crime films
Films directed by Robert Tronson
1960s lost films
Films shot at Pinewood Studios
Lost British films
1960s English-language films
1960s British films